AtmaSphere is an Australian jazz ensemble led by formed by David Jones. They were nominated for the ARIA Award for Best Jazz Album in 1994 for their album Flying. Flying was released in 1993 and included guest appearances from Mike Nock and Don Burrows.

Members
 David Jones (drums and percussion)
 Daryl Pratt (vibraphone and effects)
 Adam Armstrong (bass)
 Carmen Warrington (vocals)
 Dev Gopalasamy (guitar)

Discography

Albums

Awards and nominations

ARIA Music Awards
The ARIA Music Awards is an annual awards ceremony that recognises excellence, innovation, and achievement across all genres of Australian music. They commenced in 1987. 

! 
|-
| 1994
| Flying]
| Best Jazz Album
| 
| 
|-

References

External links
AtmaSphere
Atmasphere : programs and related material collected by the National Library of Australia

Australian musical groups